Joyce Marie Pensato (1941-2019) was an American painter. Pensato was born on August 20, 1941, in Brooklyn, New York. She studied at the Art Students League of New York and the New York Studio School.  Pensato was known for her painted interpretations of pop culture and cartoon characters such as Batman, Mickey Mouse, Felix the Cat, and Homer Simpson. 

Pensato was the recipient of a Guggenheim Fellowship, the Anonymous Was A Woman Award, and the Robert De Niro Sr. Prize. Her work is included in the collections of the Whitney Museum of American Art, the Museum of Modern Art, New York. as well as the Centre Pompidou, the Hammer Museum in Los Angeles, and the San Francisco Museum of Modern Art. 

Pensato died on June 13, 2019, in Manhattan.

References

Further reading
 The Commanding, Flamboyant Joyce Pensato by Gregory Volk, Hyperallergic 

1941 births
2019 deaths
20th-century American women artists
20th-century American painters
21st-century American women artists
21st-century American painters
American women painters
Artists from Brooklyn
New York Studio School of Drawing, Painting and Sculpture alumni